Armands Celitāns (Kraslava, May 28, 1984) is a Latvian volleyball player who plays on the Latvia men's national volleyball team. His brother, Gundars Celitāns, is also a volleyball player.

Clubs
  Lase-R Riga (2008-2010) 
  Knack Roeselare (2010-2011)
  Paris Volley 2011-2013

References

1984 births
Latvian men's volleyball players
Living people